The 1992 African Men's Handball Championship was the tenth edition of the African Men's Handball Championship, held in Yamoussoukro, Ivory Coast, from 11 to 24 November 1992. It acted as the African qualifying tournament for the 1993 World Championship in Sweden.

Egypt win their second consecutive title beating Tunisia in the final game.

Qualified teams

Preliminary round
All times are local (UTC+1).

Group A

Group B

Group C

Main round

Group I

Group II

Knockout stage

Seventh place game

Fifth place game

Third place game

Final

Final ranking

References 

African handball championships
Handball
A
Handball in Ivory Coast
20th century in Ivory Coast
November 1992 sports events in Africa